Cronenberg may refer to:

People
Cronenberg (surname), people with the surname
 David Cronenberg (born 1943), Canadian filmmaker, screenwriter and actor

Places
 Cronenberg, Rhineland-Palatinate, a municipality in Rhineland-Palatinate, Germany
 Cronenberg, Wuppertal, a former town, since 1929 part of Wuppertal, Germany

See also 

 
 Kronenberg (disambiguation)
 Kronenburg (disambiguation)